Tiangong may refer to:

Space station 
 The Tiangong space station (Chinese large modular space station), a Chinese space station launched in modules in the 2020s
 Smaller space stations for testing:
 Tiangong-1 (2011)
 Tiangong-2 (2016)
 Tiangong-3, cancelled 
Tiangong program, an overview of the Chinese space station program as a whole

Others 
 Shijiazhuang Tiangong, football (soccer) club for Shijiazhuang, Hebei
 Tiangong International, steel company
 Tiangong Kaiwu, encyclopedia written by Song Yingxing
 Tiangong University, formerly known as Tianjin Polytechnic University, in Tianjin, China
 Tiangongyuan station (Beijing Subway), subway station in Beijing, China
 Jade Emperor, also known as Tian Gong, the name of Taoist deity, the Ruler of Heaven
 Sky Bow, Romanized as Tiengong or Tiangong, Taiwanese surface-to-air missiles